Saco is an unincorporated community located in Mitchell County, Georgia, United States.

Geography
Saco is located at the intersection of Tanglewood Road and Stage Coach Road. John Collins Road, Drew C. White Road, Hinsonton Road, and Lake Pleasant Church Road lie in the area. Little Creek runs through the area.

References

Unincorporated communities in Georgia (U.S. state)
Unincorporated communities in Mitchell County, Georgia